Zamarud Khan is an ex-MD, former chairman of Pakistan Bait-ul-Mal, ex-MNA and the Patron in Chief of Pakistan Sweet Homes – an internationally renowned project for the welfare of orphans of Pakistan. He is known for his involvement in a hostage crisis in Pakistan on 15 August 2013, where he attempted to subdue the hostage-taker. Police used the unplanned distraction to fire at the gunman, which injured him and led to his arrest.

References

Living people
Pakistan People's Party politicians
1968 births